James Menendez is a British journalist and radio broadcaster working for BBC News, BBC World Service, and BBC World News.  Menendez is one of the main presenters of Newshour on the BBC World Service.

Career 
Menendez joined the BBC as a trainee reporter in 1995.  He then became a reporter for the BBC World Service before becoming the BBC Correspondent in Venezuela.

In 2004, Menendez moved back to London, as an occasional presenter on Newshour and The World Today.  In 2007, he became one of the main presenters of World Briefing before becoming a main presenter on Newshour.  In addition to presenting the programme, Menendez reports for Newshour from around the world. On 13 April 2015, he started presenting World News Today on BBC Four and BBC World News.

In 2017, an interview he was conducting on BBC World News with Robert Kelly went viral after the interviewees children busted in and started dancing.

On 1 July 2022 Menendez presented The World Tonight on BBC Radio 4.

References

BBC newsreaders and journalists
BBC World Service presenters
BBC World News
British radio presenters
Living people
British people of Mexican descent
Year of birth missing (living people)